Reddy Catholics are a loose sect or association of Catholics that grew out of the first Christian converts in Andhra Pradesh, India. They generally speak Telugu and often retain some of their Hindu customs. There are branches in many parts of the world.

History 
The first convert to Christianity in Andhra Pradesh was Thumma Hanumantha Reddy, also known as Manda Reddy. Manda Reddy, along with thirty Reddy families of Muddiguba and some other Reddy families in Alamuru, embraced Christianity in 1715. In the Rayalaseema region, many Reddies began visiting churches and converted to Christianity (Catholicism). By 1735, in South Andhra, there were thousands of Christians, most of whom belonged to the Reddy and traditional weaver communities.

Many Reddies in Guntur district have converted in to Roman Catholisim. Reddies who converted to Roman Catholicism still kept some the Hindu traditions like thali, bottu. Some of the Catholic Reddies migrated to Telangana via Krishna river. In Telangana they named their village as Guntur pally, Reddypuram or Reddypalem. By 1750, Christianity further spread to the Circar Districts due to the migration of Christian Reddies into those areas. In the early 18th century, many Catholic Reddies had migrated from Rayalaseema to some parts of Tamil Nadu, and Telangana. In Tamil Nadu, many Reddy Catholic villages can be found in districts of Chingleput and Kancheepuram like Thatchur and Kilachery, Pallipattu, Sakainagar, Pathur, Boothur, etc all these villages are dominated by Telugu-speaking Reddy Catholics.

Reddy Catholics mainly live under

 Roman Catholic Diocese of Kurnool
 Roman Catholic Diocese of Cuddapah
 Roman Catholic Diocese of Guntur
 Roman Catholic Diocese of Chingleput 
 Roman Catholic Archdiocese of Hyderabad
 Roman Catholic Archdiocese of Madras and Mylapore
 Roman Catholic Archdiocese of Bangalore.

See also 
 Goan Catholics
 Telugu Christians
 Christianity in Tamil Nadu
 Mangalorean Catholics
 Latin Catholics of Malabar
 East Indian Catholics

References

Catholicism in India